Albiston is a surname. Notable people with the surname include:

Alec Albiston (1917–1998), Australian rules footballer
Arthur Albiston (born 1957), Scottish footballer
David Albiston (born 1944), Australian rules footballer
Harold Albiston (1916–1990), Australian rules footballer
Jordie Albiston (1961–2022), Australian poet and academic
Ken Albiston (1926–2018), Australian rules footballer
Mark Albiston (born 1972), New Zealand film and television director
Wendy Albiston (born 1969), Welsh actress